Klina is a town and municipality located in the District of Peja of north-western Kosovo. According to the 2011 census, the town of Klina has 5,542 inhabitants, while the municipality has 38,496 inhabitants. It is located at the confluence of the river Klina into the White Drin. A symbol of Klina are the Mirusha Waterfalls.

History 

During early Middle Ages, Porphyrogenitus mentions the urban center of Desstinik, today Dërsnik, where important archeological discoveries of Roman period were made in August 2013, described as: ...the most important discovery of the past few decades to have been made in Kosovo in the area of archaeology.

Economy 
There is one bauxite mine operating on the territory of Klina - Grebnik mine.

Demography 

According to the last official census done in 2011, the municipality of Klina has 38,496 inhabitants. Based on the population estimates from the Kosovo Agency of Statistics in 2016, the municipality has 39,759 inhabitants.

The ethnic composition of the municipality:

In September 2014, 12 Egyptian families returned to Klina having spent the last 15 years displaced in Podgorica, Montenegro. The families moved straight into a newly constructed neighbourhood as part of project helping refugees from the Kosovo War return to Kosovo.

Notable people 
Anton Berisha, Kosovo-Albanian folklorist and scholar
Sadik Rama Gjurgjeviku, Kosovo-Albanian guerrilla fighter

Notes

References

External links 

Municipality of KlinaOfficial Website

 
Municipalities of Kosovo
Cities in Kosovo
Populated places in Peja District